is a Japanese motorcycle road racer. He was the MFJ All Japan Road Race GP250 champion in 2001 and the European 250cc champion in 2003.

Career
Sekiguchi began his Grand Prix career competing in the 1999 250cc Japanese Grand Prix. He suffered a serious accident during the 2007 Czech Republic Grand Prix warm-up at Brno, where he struck Marco Simoncelli's crashed Gilera bike at full speed; he was airlifted to a hospital in Brno, where doctors confirmed he had a broken pelvis and two fractured ribs. After losing his Grand Prix ride, Sekiguchi returned to Japan, to the MFJ All Japan Road Race GP250 Championship. He moved into the MFJ All Japan Road Race ST600 Championship in 2009, before switching to the MFJ All Japan Road Race J-GP2 Championship, where he finished as runner-up in 2011, 8th in 2012, 12th in 2013, 6th in 2014 and 3rd in 2015. In 2016 Sekiguchi appeared again in a Grand Prix as a wild card in the Moto2 class in his home race. In 2016, 2017 and 2018 he was again the J-GP2 runner-up and in 2019 he moved to the JSB1000 class, finishing 14th.

Career statistic

Grand Prix motorcycle racing

Races by year
(key) (Races in bold indicate pole position; races in italics indicate fastest lap)

References

External links

Sportspeople from Tokyo
Japanese motorcycle racers
250cc World Championship riders
1975 births
Living people
People from Western Tokyo
Moto2 World Championship riders